Astele is a genus of sea snails, marine gastropod mollusks in the family Calliostomatidae.

Some authors use Astele Swainson, 1855 as a subgenus in Calliostoma Swainson, 1840 and in Astele Swainson, 1855

Species
Species within the genus Astele include:

 Astele allanae (Iredale, 1930)
 Astele armillata (Wood, 1828)
 †Astele boileaui Marwick, 1931
 Astele bularra Garrard, 1961
 Astele ciliaris (Menke, 1843)
 Astele monile (Reeve, 1863)
 Astele multigrana (Dunker, 1871)
 Astele pulcherrima (Sowerby III, 1914)
 Astele punctocostata (A. Adams, 1853)
 Astele rubiginosa (Valenciennes, 1846)
 Astele scitula (A. Adams, 1854)
 Astele similaris (Reeve, 1863)
 Astele speciosa (A. Adams in H. Adams & A. Adams, 1854)
 Astele stenomphala E. A. Smith, 1898
 Astele subcarinata (Swainson, 1854)
Species brought into synonymy
 Astele bilix Hedley, 1905: synonym of Calliobasis bilix (Hedley, 1905)
 Astele calliston Verco, 1905: synonym of Callistele calliston (Verco, 1905)
 Astele ciliare [sic]: synonym of Astele ciliaris (Menke, 1843)
 Astele multigranum [sic]: synonym of Astele multigrana (Dunker, 1871)
 Astele nobilis Hirase, 1922: synonym of Calliostoma nobile (Hirase, 1922)

References

External links

 
Calliostomatidae